HNLMS Dolfijn (S808)  is a  of the Royal Netherlands Navy. Dolfijn has been deployed both for naval exercises and in combat operations around the world. Furthermore, the submarine plays an important role by performing intelligence operations.

Activities
HNLMS Dolfijn has taken part in several operations, a few examples are:
 During NATO operation Allied Force, Dolfijn upheld a trade embargo off the coast of former Yugoslavia. She also eavesdropped enemy communication and forwarded the obtained information to the military forces of the NATO. At the same time she also forwarded enemy ship movements to the Western European Union.
 In 2012 Dolfijn took part in anti-piracy operation Ocean Shield that took place off the coast of Somalia.
 At the beginning of 2013 the Netherlands Maritime Special Operations Forces (NLMARSOF) trained with the Dolfijn in the Caribbean Sea. This is important because in the area there is a lot of illegal drug trade and the Netherlands tries to stop this with other countries.

Maintenance and upgrade 
In 2016 Dolfijn was taken out of service after being active for years by the Royal Netherlands Navy to perform maintenance and modernize its systems. For example, the ageing GIPSY combat system will be replaced with the more modern Guardion combat system. Besides changing the software suit, hardware components were also either replaced or upgraded with newer versions. The Medium Range Sonar (MRS) and Long Range Sonar (LRS) will get replaced by new ones. In addition a new sonar was added, which is called the Mine and Obstacle Avoidance Sonar (MOAS). The Consoles and screens in the command room also will get an upgrade to more modern versions, while the navigation and attack periscopes will go from being depended on analog sensors to digital sensors. This will be done by replacing several masts. The holes have already been drilled for this upgrade. Lastly, the Mark 48 torpedoes were upgraded from Mod 4 to the more recent Mod 7.

COVID-19 pandemic 

On 30 March 2020, the Ministry of Defence reported that eight crew members of Dolfijn had tested positive. Out of 58 crew members, 15 sailors with mild symptoms were tested. The submarine changed course near Scotland to return to the Netherlands two weeks early, arriving in Den Helder on 3 April.

Dolfijn made a routine port visit to the United States at Naval Station Mayport, Florida in May 2022.

Gallery

See also
 Ships of the Royal Netherlands Navy

References

Sources

External links 

 Koninklijke Marine
 Walrus-class submarines
 Walrusklasse onderzeeboten
 Onderzeeboot Zeeleeuw kan weer 10 jaar mee
 Opknapbeurt voegt dimensie toe
 Vernieuwde Zeeleeuw maakte grote sprong door de tijd

Walrus-class submarines
Submarines of the Netherlands
1990 ships
Ships built in Rotterdam
Naval ships involved in the COVID-19 pandemic